Richard Dale Kauzlarich (born August 18, 1944) is an American diplomat, writer, and intelligence analyst.

Early life and education
Kauzlarich was born in Moline, Illinois on August 18, 1944. He graduated from Black Hawk College in 1964 with an associate of arts degree. He received his B. A. from Valparaiso University and M.A.s from Indiana University and the University of Michigan.

Career
Kauzlarich served as Deputy Assistant Secretary of State for International Organization Affairs in 1984–1986 and as deputy director of the State Department's Policy Planning Staff in 1986–1989, handling global and international economic issues.

Kauzlarich was Deputy Assistant Secretary of State in the Bureau of European Affairs in 1991–93, responsible for relations with the former Soviet Union and economic ties with the European Union.

Between 1993 and 1994, he served as Senior Deputy to the Secretary of State's and the President's Special Representative to the Newly Independent States (NIS), responsible for conflict resolution in the Caucasus region and U.S. economic relations with the NIS.

In the Foreign Service, he served at U.S. Embassies in Ethiopia, Israel, and Togo, as well as serving as United States Ambassador to Azerbaijan in 1994–1997 and to Bosnia and Herzegovina in 1997–1999.

After a 32-year career in the Foreign Service, Kauzlarich was Director of the Special Initiative on the Muslim World at the United States Institute of Peace.

In December 2001, his report, "Time for Change? US Policy in the Transcaucasus" was published by the Century Foundation.

In Spring 2002, Kauzlarich joined the National Intelligence Council (NIC). He was appointed National Intelligence Officer for Europe in September 2003.

References

Sources
Bio at National Intelligence Council, Office of the Director of National Intelligence
Bio at The Globalist

External links 
Croatians.com Short biography of Richard Kauzlarich

1944 births
Living people
Ambassadors of the United States to Azerbaijan
Ambassadors of the United States to Bosnia and Herzegovina
Black Hawk College alumni
Indiana University alumni
United States Department of State officials
University of Michigan alumni
Valparaiso University alumni
United States Foreign Service personnel
20th-century American diplomats